Compton Branch is a stream in Washington County in the U.S. state of Missouri. It is a tributary of Hazel Creek.

It is unknown why the name "Compton" was applied to this stream.

See also
List of rivers of Missouri

References

Rivers of Washington County, Missouri
Rivers of Missouri